Robert Balderston Burgess (25 December 1890 – 9 December 1915) was a rugby union player, who represented . He died at Armentières during the First World War.

Early life
Burgess was born on 25 December 1890 to Henry Burgess, a railway manager, and his wife Agnes. He went to Portora Royal School, where he played rugby and was reputedly the best forward in the team. From there he went to Trinity College, Dublin.

Rugby career
Burgess was fast for a forward, and a strong tackler. From 1913 to 1914, Burgess was playing for Dublin University Football Club and was the club's honorary secretary.
He was invited to play for the Barbarians, alongside Alexander Jackson, the Irish centre, and former  captain Edgar Mobbs, against Newport RFC on 27 December 1913, losing 14–0.

International appearance

Military service and death
Soon after the First World War began, in November 1914, Burgess was commissioned in the Royal Army Service Corps. He was soon promoted to captain in January 1915 and served with the Royal Engineers. On 9 December 1915, he was hit by a shell while cycling down the rue de Dunkerque in Armentières, northern France, and died at a casualty clearing station. He was the fourth Irish international rugby player to be killed in action in the First World War. His commanding officer said of him:  He is buried at the Bailleul Communal Cemetery Extension Nord (II.B.63), and is commemorated at the entrance to the reading room at Trinity College, Dublin.

References

Bibliography
 

1890 births
1915 deaths
British military personnel killed in World War I
British Army personnel of World War I
Place of birth missing
Irish rugby union players
Ireland international rugby union players
Royal Engineers officers
Alumni of Trinity College Dublin
Royal Army Service Corps officers
Rugby union forwards